On October 8, 1852, Maria Perkins, an enslaved woman in Charlottesville, Virginia, United States, addressed a letter to her husband, also enslaved. In the letter, she shares the news that their son Albert has been sold to a trader, expresses fears that she too might be sold, and says that she wants her family to be reunited. Perkins was literate, something uncommon among slaves, and all that is known about her comes from this letter.

Ulrich Bonnell Phillips discovered the letter and published it in 1929. Christopher Hager, in his book Word by Word (2013), critically analyzes the document as a case study and suggests that it progresses from conventional correspondence to frantic diarying. Often cited as an example of slave writing, Perkins's letter is quoted by many US textbooks to illustrate slaves' personal struggle, heartbreak, and strategic thinking.

Background

The literacy rate among 19th-century slaves is estimated to have ranged from 5 to 20 percent. Though a substantial number of letters written by slaves have survived, accounts of African-American life in the antebellum period are more commonly studied through slave narratives written or dictated by former slaves. Few actively enslaved people were "free" enough to write to family members to warn that they might presently be traded. "It is seldom that the historian finds recorded the personal emotion of the victims of the internal slave trade," author Willie Lee Nichols Rose writes in reference to Maria Perkins's letter. Historian Christopher Hager calls the genre of works by people at the time of enslavement the "enslaved narrative".

Perkins's letter was rediscovered by Yale University historian Ulrich Bonnell Phillips, who published it in Life and Labor of the American South (originally 1929). Phillips most likely found the letter among thousands of documents in a farmhouse outside Greenville, Virginia. Phillips and his friend Herbert Kellar visited the house and bought the collection of about 25,000 documents from farmer George Armentrout. Prefacing Perkins's letter in Life and Labor, Phillips reflects on "a letter which lies before me in the slave's own writing," one of the few slave letters published in the book. He adds, "We cannot brush away this woman's tears."

Maria Perkins

Maria Perkins was enslaved in Charlottesville, Virginia. The letter by her that begins, "My master has sold Albert to a trader," is the only surviving record of her life. In the letter, she writes that her son Albert has been taken away by a trader with the name Brady, perhaps to Scottsville or further. Maria thinks that she will be sold herself soon. The letter, which was dated October 8, 1852, was addressed from Charlottesville to Maria's husband Richard, who was owned by a different master. Fearing that the family may be further broken apart, Maria writes that she wants to try to reunite the family and suggests a possible method. However, slaves rarely could have such control over their future. Perkins asks her husband to try to convince his owner, or one Dr. Hamilton, to buy her and an unidentified "other child".

According to historian David Brion Davis, Perkins was almost certainly one of the more than one million slaves who were sold from their original residences to the Old Southwest in the 1850s. Willie Lee Nichols Rose writes that Perkins "was naturally more alarmed at the prospect of being bought by a trader who might sell her far from home and family, than if he were a local person." The Perkins family's situation was, despite the letter, out of their control, author Walter Dean Myers wrote in 1992: "It is the dignity of the human reduced to the idea of thing. For this is what this woman has become. This is what her child has become. It is a situation that no kind treatment can assuage, a wound of the soul that will never heal."

Interpretation

The second chapter of Hager's book Word by Word: Emancipation and the Act of Writing (2013) focuses on Perkins's letter—a commonly cited example of slave writing—as a case study. According to Hager, high-school textbooks on US history which quote the letter emphasize different themes. Some focus on the toll of her heartsickness, while others highlight her strategic suggestions to reunite her family. Hager finds that modern publications of the letter generally use just the first half, in which Perkins was apparently more "careful" in writing.

Hager notes that features of Perkins's penmanship, such as the use of ſ ("long s"), suggest that she was taught to write by an older person who was formally educated. Structurally, the letter's first ten lines explain what has happened and what Perkins wants to happen. Toward the start of the letter, Perkins apparently corrected some grammatical errors (e.g., adding the word on before Monday and adding the letter n in want) and seemed more "deliberate". As the letter continues, she appears to have sped up and neglected to dip her pen in ink, producing misspellings and suggesting heightened urgency. This is reflected in the letter's meaning; it moves from being a piece of correspondence to, as Hager writes, "a diaristic mode of private reflection."

The final clause of the letter (from "my things" to "heart sick") is difficult to parse and open to interpretation. Hager writes that it likely means, "By the time I get the opportunity to go to Staunton (if I ever do), I will have become quite heartsick." The "things" to which Perkins refers are not clearly articulated, Hager notes, and the word can encompass an array of meanings. Historian Dylan C. Penningroth suggests that "my things" refers literally to her belongings. The phrase "in several places", which refers to "my things", may also be read metaphorically to refer to Perkins's distance from her husband and separation from her children.

References
Citations

Bibliography

 
 
 
 
 
 
 
 

Year of birth unknown
Year of death unknown
19th-century American slaves
American letter writers
Women letter writers
19th-century American writers
19th-century American women writers
African-American women writers
Writers from Charlottesville, Virginia
Works about American slavery
American women non-fiction writers
African-American writers
 19th-century African-American women